Sydney Noël Lemmon (born August 10, 1990) is an American actress.  Lemmon graduated from Yale School of Drama at Yale University. She stars as Ana Helstrom in the Hulu series Helstrom.
She has appeared in the HBO series Succession. Lemmon earned a Saturn Award nomination for her role as Isabelle in Season 5 of Fear the Walking Dead.

Filmography

Film

Television

References

External links
 

1990 births
Living people
21st-century American actresses
Actresses from Los Angeles
American film actresses
American people of Italian descent
American television actresses
Yale School of Drama alumni
Lemmon family